Paşaköy is a village in the İpsala District of Edirne Province in Turkey.

References

Villages in İpsala District